Cryphia is a genus of moths of the family Noctuidae. The genus was erected by Jacob Hübner in 1818.

Description
Palpi slender and upturned, where the third joint reaching above vertex of head. Antennae minutely ciliated (hairy). Thorax with slight tufts behind collar. Abdomen with slight dorsal tufts, and longer than the hindwing. Larva with four pairs of abdominal prolegs.

Species
 Cryphia albipuncta (Barnes & McDunnough, 1910)
 Cryphia algae (Fabricius, 1775) – tree-lichen beauty
 Cryphia amasina (Draudt, 1931)
 Cryphia amseli Boursin, 1952
 Cryphia amygdalina Boursin, 1963
 Cryphia cuerva (Barnes, 1907)
 Cryphia domestica (Hufnagel, 1766) – marbled beauty
 Cryphia ereptricula (Treitschke, 1825)
 Cryphia fascia (Smith, [1904])
 Cryphia flavidior (Barnes & McDunnough, 1911)
 Cryphia flavipuncta Mustelin, 2006
 Cryphia fraudatricula (Hübner, [1803])
 Cryphia gea Boursin, 1954
 Cryphia labecula (Lederer, 1855)
 Cryphia merhaba Hacker & Fibiger, 2006
 Cryphia moeonis (Lederer, 1865)
 Cryphia muralis (Forster, 1771) – marbled green
 Cryphia nana (Barnes & McDunnough, 1911)
 Cryphia oaklandiae (Barnes & McDunnough, 1911)
 Cryphia ochsi (Boursin, 1940)
 Cryphia olivacea (Smith, 1891)
 Cryphia orthogramma Boursin, 1954
 Cryphia pallidioides Poole, 1989
 Cryphia paulina (Staudinger, 1892)
 Cryphia petrea (Guenée, 1852)
 Cryphia petricolor (Lederer, 1869)
 Cryphia postochrea (Hampson, 1893)
 Cryphia raptricula (Denis & Schiffermüller, 1775) – marbled gray
 Cryphia ravula (Hübner, [1813])
 Cryphia receptricula (Hübner, [1803])
 Cryphia rectilinea (Warren, 1909)
 Cryphia sarepta (Barnes, 1907)
 Cryphia seladonia (Christoph, 1885)
 Cryphia simulatricula (Guenée, 1852)
 Cryphia strobinoi Dujardin, 1972
 Cryphia tephrocharis Boursin, 1954
 Cryphia vandalusiae (Duponchel, 1842)

Former species
 Cryphia viridata is now Bryolymnia viridata (Harvey, 1876)

References

 
 Hacker, H. & Fibiger, M. (2006). "Updated list of Micronoctuidae, Noctuidae (s.l.), and Hyblaeidae species of Yemen, collected during three expeditions in 1996, 1998 and 2000, with comments and descriptions of species." Esperiana Buchreihe zur Entomologie 12: 75-166.
 
 Pekarsky, O., & Ronkay, L. (2010). "Subfamily Bryophilinae Guenée. The Bryophila raptricula species-complex. in: Fibiger, M., Ronkay, L., Yela, J.L. & Zilli, A. (2010): Rivulinae – Phytometrinae, and Micronoctuidae, including Supplement to Noctuidae Europaeae, vols 1-11. Noctuidae Europaeae, volume 12." – Entomological Press, Sorø, 504 pp. + 13 colour plates.
 Pekarsky, O., Volynkin, A., & Matov, A. (2014). "A new species of Bryophila Treitschke, 1825 from Mongolia (Lepidoptera, Noctuidae, Bryophilinae)." Zootaxa 3856 (1): 143–148.
 Pekarsky, O. (2014). "A new species of Bryoleuca Treitschke, 1825 from Kazakhstan (Lepidoptera, Noctuidae, Bryophilinae)." Fibigeriana Supplement: Volume 2. 171–176 pp. color plate 298 p.

 
Bryophilinae